See also parent article Bird species new to science

This page details the bird species described as new to science in the years 2010 to 2019:

Summary statistics

Number of species described per year

Countries with high numbers of newly described species

 Brazil
 Peru 
 Philippines
 Indonesia

The birds, year-by-year

2010
 Limestone leaf warbler, Phylloscopus calciatilis: 
 Fenwick's antpitta or Urrao antpitta, Grallaria fenwickorum: 
 Socotra buzzard, Buteo socotraensis: 
 Willard's sooty boubou, Laniarius willardi: 
 Rock tapaculo, Scytalopus petrophilus:

2011
 Tsingy wood rail, Canirallus beankaensis: 
 Bryan's shearwater, Puffinus bryani: 
 Várzea thrush, Turdus sanchezorum:

2012
 Alta Floresta antpitta, Hylopezus whittakeri: 
 Antioquia wren, Thryophilus sernai: 
 Sira barbet, Capito fitzpatricki: 
 †Bermuda towhee, Pipilo naufragus: 
 Cipó cinclodes, Cinclodes pabsti espinhacensis: . Lumped with long-tailed cinclodes (Cinclodes pabsti) in 2013 
 Camiguin hawk-owl, Ninox leventisi:. Split from Philippine hawk-owl.
 Cebu hawk-owl, Ninox rumseyi: Split from Philippine hawk-owl.

2013
 Rinjani scops owl, Otus jolandae:
 Pincoya storm petrel, Oceanites pincoyae:
 Delta Amacuro softtail, Thripophaga amacurensis:
 †Bermuda flicker, Colaptes oceanicus:
 †Sao Miguel scops owl, Otus frutuosoi : 
 Seram masked owl, Tyto almae:
 Junin tapaculo, Scytalopus gettyae:
 Cambodian tailorbird Orthotomus chaktomuk:
 Tropeiro seedeater, Sporophila beltoni: 
Sierra Madre ground warbler Robsonius thompsoni: 
Guerrero brush-finch  Arremon kuehnerii: 
Omani owl Strix omanensis: 
 †New Caledonia snipe, Coenocorypha neocaledonica: 

The following 15 Brazilian species are described in the 17th volume of the Handbook of the Birds of the World:
 Western striolated-puffbird, Nystalus obamai
 Xingu woodcreeper, Dendrocolaptes retentus
 Inambari woodcreeper, Lepidocolaptes fatimalimae
 Tupana scythebill, Campylorhamphus gyldenstolpei
 Tapajós scythebill, Campylorhamphus cardosoi
 Roosevelt stipple-throated antwren, Epinecrophylla dentei
 Bamboo antwren, Myrmotherula oreni
 Predicted antwren, Herpsilochmus praedictus
 Aripuana antwren, Herpsilochmus stotzi
 Manicoré warbling antbird, Hypocnemis rondoni
 Chico's tyrannulet, Zimmerius chicomendesi
 Acre tody-tyrant, Hemitriccus cohnhafti
 Sucunduri yellow-margined flycatcher, Tolmomyias sucunduri
 Inambari gnatcatcher, Polioptila attenboroughi
 Campina jay, Cyanocorax hafferi

2014
 São Paulo marsh antwren Formicivora paludicola: 
[the last issue of RBO 21, from "Dec 2013", was released only in March 2014]
 Wakatobi flowerpecker Dicaeum kuehni: 
 †Cryptic treehunter Cichlocolaptes mazarbarnetti 
 Bahian mouse-colored tapaculo Scytalopus gonzagai: 
 Sulawesi streaked flycatcher (Muscicapa sodhii) :

2015
 Desert owl Strix hadorami: 
 Perijá tapaculo Scytalopus perijanus: 
 Sichuan bush warbler Locustella chengi:

2016
 Himalayan forest thrush Zoothera salimalii: 
Dahomey forest robin Stiphrornis dahomeyensis: Voelker, G.; Tobler, M.; Prestridge, H. L.; Duijm, E.; Groenenberg, D.; Hutchinson, M. R.; Martin, A. D.; Nieman, A.; Roselaar, C. S.; Huntley, J. W. (2016). "Three new species of Stiphrornis (Aves: Muscicapidae) from the Afro-tropics, with a molecular phylogenetic assessment of the genus". Systematics and Biodiversity. doi:10.1080/14772000.2016.1226978
Ghana forest robin Stiphrornis inexpectatus: Voelker, G.; Tobler, M.; Prestridge, H. L.; Duijm, E.; Groenenberg, D.; Hutchinson, M. R.; Martin, A. D.; Nieman, A.; Roselaar, C. S.; Huntley, J. W. (2016). "Three new species of Stiphrornis (Aves: Muscicapidae) from the Afro-tropics, with a molecular phylogenetic assessment of the genus". Systematics and Biodiversity. doi:10.1080/14772000.2016.1226978.
Rudder's forest robin Stiphrornis rudderi:  Voelker, G.; Tobler, M.; Prestridge, H. L.; Duijm, E.; Groenenberg, D.; Hutchinson, M. R.; Martin, A. D.; Nieman, A.; Roselaar, C. S.; Huntley, J. W. (2016). "Three new species of Stiphrornis (Aves: Muscicapidae) from the Afro-tropics, with a molecular phylogenetic assessment of the genus". Systematics and Biodiversity. doi:10.1080/14772000.2016.1226978
Ibera seedeater Sporophila iberaensis: Adrian Di Giacomo, Bernabe López-Lanús and Cecilia Kopuchian. 2017. A New Species of Seedeater (Emberizidae: Sporophila) from the Iberá grasslands, in northeast Argentina. bioRxiv. 046318. doi:10.1101/0463182017

2017 

 Tatama tapaculo Scytalopus alvarezlopezi: Stiles, F. Gary; Laverde-R., Oscar; Cadena, Carlos Daniel (2017). "A new species of tapaculo (Rhinocryptidae: Scytalopus) from the Western Andes of Colombia". The Auk. 134 (2): 377–392. doi:10.1642/AUK-16-205.1.
Ashambu blue robin Sholicola ashambuensis: Robin, V., Vishnudas, C.K., Gupta, P. et al. Two new genera of songbirds represent endemic radiations from the Shola Sky Islands of the Western Ghats, India. BMC Evol Biol 17, 31 (2017) doi:10.1186/s12862-017-0882-6
 Blue-winged amazon Amazona gomezgarzai: Silva, Tony; Guzmán, Antonio; Urantówka, Adam D.; Mackiewicz, Paweł (2017). "A new parrot taxon from the Yucatán Peninsula, Mexico—its position within genus Amazona based on morphology and molecular phylogeny". PeerJ. 5: e3475. doi:10.7717/peerj.3475
Painted manakin Machaeropterus eckelberryi: Daniel F. Lane, Andrew W. Kratter, John P. O’Neill. A new species of manakin (Aves: Pipridae; Machaeropterus) from Peru with a taxonomic reassessment of the Striped Manakin (M. regulus) complex . Zootaxa, 2017; 4320 (2): 379 DOI: 10.11646/zootaxa.4320.2.11
Dry-forest sabrewing Campylopterus calcirupicola: Lopes, Leonardo; Ferreira de Vasconcelos, Marcelo; Gonzaga, Luiz (2017-05-15). "A cryptic new species of hummingbird of the Campylopterus largipennis complex (Aves: Trochilidae)". Zootaxa. 4268: 1–33. doi:10.11646/zootaxa.4268.1.1
†Greater Azores bullfinch Pyrrhula crassa: J. C. Rando, H. Pieper, Storrs L. Olson, F. Pereira and J. A. Alcover. 2017. A New Extinct Species of Large Bullfinch (Aves: Fringillidae: Pyrrhula) from Graciosa Island (Azores, North Atlantic Ocean). Zootaxa. 4282(3); 567–583.  DOI: 10.11646/zootaxa.4282.3.9
 Rote myzomela Myzomela irianawidodoae: Dewi Malia Prawiradilaga, Pratibha Baveja, Suparno, Hidayat Ashari, Nathaniel Sheng Rong Ng, Chyi Yin Gwee, Philippe Verbelen and Frank Erwin Rheindt (2017). A colorful new species of Myzomela Honeyeater from Rote Island in Eastern Indonesia. Treubia. Number: 44. Pages: 77-100. December. http://e-journal.biologi.lipi.go.id/index.php/treubia/article/view/3414
Santa Marta screech owl Megascops gilesi: Krabbe, N. K. (2017). "A new species of Megascops (Strigidae) from the Sierra Nevada de Santa Marta, Colombia, with notes on voices of New World screech-owls". Ornitología Colombiana. 16: 1–27.

2018

Cordillera Azul antbird Myrmoderus eowilsoni: Andre E. Moncrieff, Oscar Johnson, Daniel F. Lane, Josh R. Beck, Fernando Angulo and Jesse Fagan. 2018. A New Species of Antbird (Passeriformes: Thamnophilidae) from the Cordillera Azul, San Martín, Peru [Una nueva especie de hormiguero (Passeriformes: Thamnophilidae) de la Cordillera Azul, San Martín, Perú]. The Auk. 135(1); 114–126. DOI: 10.1642/AUK-17-97.1
Whenua Hou diving petrel Pelecanoides whenuahouensis: Fischer, Johannes H.; Debski, Igor; Miskelly, Colin M.; Bost, Charles A.; Fromant, Aymeric; Tennyson, Alan J. D.; Tessler, Jake; Cole, Rosalind; Hiscock, Johanna H. (2018-06-27). "Analyses of phenotypic differentiations among South Georgian Diving Petrel (Pelecanoides georgicus) populations reveal an undescribed and highly endangered species from New Zealand". PLOS ONE. 13 (6): e0197766. doi:10.1371/journal.pone.0197766. ISSN 1932-6203
Western square-tailed drongo Dicrurus occidentalis: Fuchs, Jérôme; DOUNO, MORY; Bowie, Rauri; Fjeldså, Jon (2018-06-20). "Taxonomic revision of the Square-tailed Drongo species complex (Passeriformes: Dicruridae) with description of a new species from western Africa". Zootaxa. 4438: 105. doi:10.11646/zootaxa.4438.1.4
Southern dark newtonia Newtonia lavarambo: Younger, Jane & Strozier, Lynika & Maddox, J. Dylan & Nyári, Árpád & Bonfitto, Matthew & Raherilalao, Marie Jeanne & Goodman, Steven & Reddy, Sushma. (2018). Hidden diversity of forest birds in Madagascar revealed using integrative taxonomy. Molecular Phylogenetics and Evolution. 124. doi: 10.1016/j.ympev.2018.02.017.
Blue-throated hillstar Oreotrochilus cyanolaemus: Francisco Sornoza-Molina, Juan F. Freile, Jonas Nilsson, Niels Krabbe and Elisa Bonaccorso. 2018. A Striking, Critically Endangered, New Species of Hillstar (Trochilidae: Oreotrochilus) from the southwestern Andes of Ecuador [Una sorprendente y críticamente amenazada especie nueva de estrella (Trochilidae: Oreotrochilus) de los Andes suroccidentales de Ecuador]. The Auk. 135(4);1146-1171. doi: 10.1642/AUK-18-58.1
Rote leaf warbler Phylloscopus rotiensis: Ng, Nathaniel. S. R.; Prawiradilaga, Dewi. M.; Ng, Elize. Y. X.; Suparno; Ashari, Hidayat; Trainor, Colin; Verbelen, Philippe; Rheindt, Frank. E. (2018-10-23). "A striking new species of leaf warbler from the Lesser Sundas as uncovered through morphology and genomics". Scientific Reports. 8 (1). doi:10.1038/s41598-018-34101-7. ISSN 2045-2322.

2019 

 Cream-eyed bulbul Pycnonotus pseudosimplex: Subir B. Shakya, Haw Chuan Lim, Robert G. Moyle, Mustafa Abdul Rahman, Maklarin Lakim and Frederick H. Sheldon. 2019. A Cryptic New Species of Bulbul from Borneo. Bulletin of the British Ornithologists' Club. 139(1) DOI 10.25226/bboc.v139i1.2019.a3 ISSN 0007-1595
Whistling long-tailed cuckoo Cercococcyx lemaireae: Peter Boesman and N. J. Collar "Two undescribed species of bird from West Africa," Bulletin of the British Ornithologists' Club 139(2), 147–159, (17 June 2019). https://doi.org/10.25226/bboc.v139i2.2019.a7
Western yellow-spotted barbet Buccanodon dowsetti: Peter Boesman and N. J. Collar "Two undescribed species of bird from West Africa," Bulletin of the British Ornithologists' Club 139(2), 147–159, (17 June 2019). https://doi.org/10.25226/bboc.v139i2.2019.a7
Alor myzomela Myzomela prawiradilagae: Mohammad Irham, Hidayat Ashari, Suparno, Colin R. Trainor, Philippe Verbelen, Meng Yue Wu and Frank E. Rheindt. 2019. A New Myzomela Honeyeater (Meliphagidae) from the Highlands of Alor Island, Indonesia. Journal of Ornithology. DOI: 10.1007/s10336-019-01722-2
Spectacled flowerpecker Dicaeum dayakorum: Jacob R. Saucier, Christopher M. Milensky, Marcos A. Caraballo-Ortiz, Roslina Ragai, N. Faridah Dahlan and David P. Edwards. 2019. A Distinctive New Species of Flowerpecker (Passeriformes: Dicaeidae) from Borneo. Zootaxa. 4686(4); 451–464. DOI: 10.11646/zootaxa.4686.4.1

Described in this period, no longer thought to be good species 

 Strix omanensis, described in 2013, is now thought to be identical with Strix butleri.
Amazona gomezgarzai, described in 2017, now thought to represent specimens of hybrid origin

Described in this period as a species but may instead be a subspecies 

Sholicola ashambuensis, described in 2017, tentatively considered a subspecies of S. albiventris by the Clements Checklist.
Newtonia lavarambo, described in 2018, tentatively considered a subspecies of N. amphicroa by the Clements Checklist.

References 

birds
'